Mister Hyde (Calvin Zabo) is a supervillain appearing in American comic books published by Marvel Comics. He is primarily an enemy of Thor and is the father of Daisy Johnson.

Calvin Zabo appeared in the television series Agents of S.H.I.E.L.D. in the second season, which is set in the Marvel Cinematic Universe, portrayed by Kyle MacLachlan.

Publication history
Mister Hyde first appeared in Journey into Mystery #99 and was created by Stan Lee and Don Heck. Mister Hyde is inspired by the 1886 literary character by Robert Louis Stevenson.

He has appeared as a regular character in Thunderbolts since issue #157, and remained with the team after the title transitioned into Dark Avengers beginning with issue #176.

Fictional character biography
Calvin Zabo was born in Trenton, New Jersey and becomes a morally abject, but brilliant biochemist who discovered the effects of hormones on human physiology. His favorite storybook is Stevenson's 1886 classic, Strange Case of Dr Jekyll and Mr Hyde. He convinced himself that the experiment Dr. Jekyll performed in the story could actually be accomplished and obsessed with the idea of unleashing his full bestial nature in a superhuman form. However, he needed money to do this, so he robbed his various employers systematically. Though too intelligent to be caught, the medical community got suspicious for his tendency of always getting employed by organizations which were subsequently robbed. Zabo eventually sought work as a surgeon in the hospital where Donald Blake, now a directing physician, yet would not allow him that job due to his history. Zabo became so enraged that Blake would not give him the position, even though he did indeed intend to rob the organization, and swore revenge. He even became successful in creating his formula and turned himself into a massive, Hulk-like creature he called Mister Hyde, named after the character in the novel. In this new form, Hyde found out he had immense strength allowing him to crush cars and tear through steel as though it were made of cardboard. With his new superhuman powers he sought out Blake, whom he tried to kill by throwing him from a window, but Blake transformed into Thor by striking his cane on the wall and survived, with Thor claiming that he have saved Blake. Hyde, hearing of this on the radio, decided to eliminate Thor. He tried framing him for a bank robbery by using his vast strength to rip open a bank vault while disguised as Thor. While Blake and Jane Foster were out, Hyde met and kidnapped them at gunpoint. As Blake, he got tied up next to a bomb that would explode in 24 hours unless Hyde defused it. However, when attempting to steal a Polaris submarine to roam the seas like a pirate, After Thor defeated Hyde, the authorities saw his brute strength and realized he must have impersonated Thor, but Thor forced himself to let him escape, as Jane thought Blake is still in danger.

Hyde went into business as a full-time professional supervillain and teamed up with the Cobra to get revenge upon Thor, but they were both defeated, despite getting Thor's hammer from him briefly. With the Cobra, he was bailed out and employed by Loki to kidnap Jane Foster and they battled Thor again. Loki doubled their powers to try to help them. Loki showed Thor where Jane was being held. The house had many traps set up for Thor, and Jane was almost killed in an explosion. Thor was able to defeat both villains, and Hyde was caught by a ray which paralyzed him. Both Hyde and the Cobra were jailed and Jane's life was saved by an Asgardian formula Balder sent to Thor. Hyde and the Cobra escaped prison, but were eventually recaptured by Daredevil. They teamed with the Jester to get revenge, but were defeated again. With the Scorpion, Hyde then battled Captain America and the Falcon. Teaming with the Cobra again, Hyde attempted to acquire Cagliostro's serum. While serving in prison following this failed attempt, Hyde was ensnared by the mind-control power of the Purple Man, and forced to battle Daredevil in an arena alongside the Cobra, the Jester and the Gladiator.

Tiring of their repeated failures, the Cobra elected to sever their partnership when he escaped from Ryker's Island, taking the time to taunt Hyde before leaving. For a long time, Hyde never forgave him for the slight. With Batroc the Leaper, Hyde later blackmailed New York City with a hijacked supertanker and attempted to destroy the entire city in order to kill the Cobra. Eventually, he was defeated by Captain America with Batroc's aid. Hyde again stalked the Cobra seeking revenge, and this time battled Spider-Man. He was imprisoned again, but escaped Ryker's Island and battled Spider-Man and the Black Cat during another attempt on the Cobra's life. Hyde later battled Daredevil again.

Hyde later became a member of Baron Helmut Zemo's incarnation of the Masters of Evil and invaded Avengers Mansion along with them, torturing the Black Knight and Edwin Jarvis. With Goliath and the Wrecking Crew, he nearly killed Hercules, but was defeated by the Avengers. Hyde later attempted an escape from the Vault alongside Titania, Vibro, the Griffin, and the Armadillo, but was defeated and recaptured by the Captain. He eventually escaped from the Vault alongside the Wizard and others. Hyde was later defeated in single combat by the Cobra, who earned Hyde's respect as a result.

Hyde later fought with The Professor and received head trauma that limited his ability to transform. He was subsequently caught by the police when he coincidentally checked into the same hotel as the one where the Daily Bugle staff were attending Robbie Robertson's retirement party, allowing Peter Parker to defeat him using an improvised costume. Shortly after, Hyde had several run-ins with the Ghost Rider in which he was defeated with the Penance Stare.

Hyde briefly helped the symbiote-bonded Toxin track the Cobra after a prison escape by providing a piece of skin for the symbiote to track with.

Zabo was being held in the Raft (the Ryker's Island Prison complex) 6 months after the events of "Avengers Disassembled." When a prison break was caused by Electro, Zabo emerged in his Hyde persona, fought with Daredevil, and was knocked unconscious by Luke Cage.

At one point, Zabo was discovered by the Young Avengers to be selling a derivative of his Hyde formula on the street as one of the various illegal substances known as Mutant Growth Hormone.

Zabo grafts abilities similar to the powers of Spider-Man to homeless teenagers. After Spider-Man revealed his identity during the "Civil War" storyline, Zabo sought to recreate the circumstances of Spider-Man's "birth", by taking in orphans off the street, imbuing them with spider-powers, and seeing whether or not the teenagers would give in to their darker impulses. During the ensuing battle with Spider-Man, Hyde pulled webbing off his face, taking his eyelids with it, and was hit in the face with hydrochloric acid, courtesy of one of his own Guinea pigs. It is stated by Spider-Man that he has been left blinded and had his face ruined as a result. Dr. Curt Connors was later seen aiding Spider-Man in a cure for Zabo, one of Zabo's test subjects.

Hyde's daughter is Daisy Johnson, who is a member of S.H.I.E.L.D.; her mother was apparently a sex worker whose services Calvin Zabo frequented and the girl was put up for adoption after birth. Daisy subsequently manifested superpowers inherited from Zabo's mutated genetic code.

The Hood hired him as part of his criminal organization to take advantage of the split in the superhero community caused by the Superhuman Registration Act.

Later, he was seen with Cobra (who was now operating as King Cobra), Firebrand and the Mauler, who attacked Yellowjacket, the Constrictor and other Initiative staff and trainees.

Hyde worked with Boomerang, Tiger Shark, and Whirlwind to manipulate Venom III into procuring Norman Osborn's fortunes. This was thwarted by Venom and Green Goblin as Osborn threw a bomb into Hyde's mouth, causing him to spit out blood. Osborn then warned Hyde and the other villains that if they ever cross him again, he will kill everyone that they ever loved before they are tortured to death.

Hyde joins the Grim Reaper's new Lethal Legion, claiming embarrassment over Norman Osborn blowing a bomb up in his mouth.

Hyde appears as a member of the Hood's crime syndicate during an attack on the New Avengers.

Hyde was selected to be a part of the "beta team" of the Thunderbolts, alongside Boomerang, the Shocker, Gunna and Centurius.

Later, Hyde began a drug operation in California where he came into conflict with Robbie Reyes after his car had some of Hyde's pills inside. Hyde's mercenaries chase Robbie down during the race in order to retrieve the car and the pills. Robbie is gunned down by the mercenaries when he mistakes them for police and they torch the scene. Robbie is revived as a demonic being called the Ghost Rider who sports a flaming helmet-like head. In this form, Robbie drives off in the car, now similarly ablaze. The Ghost Rider defeats a few mercenaries and soon disappears in an explosion. Robbie eventually fights and defeats Zabo, becoming something of a local hero and urban legend. Having regrouped and refined his Hyde formula into new blue pills, Calvin Zabo gradually takes over the L.A. criminal underground with his "Blue Hyde Brigade", which includes Guero and his gang, longtime enemies of Robbie, calling themselves the "Blue Krüe."

During the "Avengers: Standoff!" storyline, Hyde was an inmate of Pleasant Hill, a gated community established by S.H.I.E.L.D. Mister Hyde was knocked out by Warwolf.

During the "Opening Salvo" part of the Secret Empire storyline, Hyde is recruited by Baron Helmut Zemo to join the Army of Evil. During HYDRA's takeover of the United States, Hyde is one of a few Army of Evil members not in a stasis pod and is shown leading a group of HYDRA soldiers to invade New Attilan and capture the Inhumans. He, alongside HYDRA's Avengers, catch his daughter Daisy and her team, the Secret Warriors. During interrogation, Daisy uses her powers to destroy the Helicarrier they are in, forcing Hyde to retreat.

Powers and abilities
The process that transforms Calvin Zabo into his Mister Hyde persona are these growth hormones caused by ingestion of a chemical formula. As his body adjusted to its new form, Hyde's strength, stamina, durability, and healing were all boosted to uncommon levels. Hyde's powers are so sufficient that he can stand up and face Joe Fixit in a fight. He was shown tearing apart an armored car door with ease. Through further experimental procedures over the years, his abilities have been increased beyond their original limits. Zabo must consume his special serum periodically in order for him to remain as one identity from another. But, mind stress or pain could impair this transformation into Hyde. He employs a wristwatch-like device supplied with the formula that injects itself directly into his bloodstream, enabling to transform himself by button pushing.

Due to the nature of these transformations, Hyde's skin is warped. This gives his face a distorted look reminiscent of Lon Chaney, Sr.'s make-up used in The Phantom of the Opera.

Zabo is also an intelligent research scientist with a Ph.D. in medicine and biochemistry. When assuming his Hyde form, he loses those skills.

Other versions

Age of Apocalypse
In the timeline of the Age of Apocalypse storyline, Mister Hyde (as well as the Cobra) is a near-feral and cannibal "scavenger". He is known to prowl graveyards and attack anyone entering his territory.

Elseworlds
Mister Hyde appeared in the Elseworlds crossover comic book Daredevil/Batman: Eye for an Eye. Two-Face partnered with Hyde for a series of technological robberies. In truth, Two-Face had implanted Hyde's brain with the material needed to "grow" an experimental "organic" computer chip and fed Hyde pills to keep him enraged. Once grown, the chip would kill Hyde, its current growth also weakening Hyde's strength as his energy is diverted to support the chip (Batman noting during the fight that Hyde should normally have a punch that could knock Superman into orbit). Hyde berates Two-Face, proud he has abandoned his past as Zabo and insults Two-Face for hanging onto his Harvey Dent side, as well as using a coin to decide between right and wrong. Two-Face is glad the process will kill Hyde. In the end, Daredevil uses his past friendship with Dent to talk Two-Face into supplying the antidote for the chip, which saves Hyde's life.

House of M

Mister Hyde appears as a member of the Hood's Masters of Evil. Before the Red Guard attacks Santo Rico, Hyde leaves the team alongside the Cobra, Crossbones, and Thunderball. Hyde was later seen as an Army scientist.

Marvel Zombies
A zombified Mister Hyde appears in Marvel Zombies 4. He is seen attacking the new Midnight Sons, trying to bite one of them, but he is quickly killed by the Man-Thing when he rips the zombie Hyde apart and then, holding a huge boulder, drops it down on him, crushing the zombie Hyde to death instantly.

Thor: The Mighty Avenger
Mister Hyde is the antagonist of the first two issues of this alternate universe retelling of Thor's origin. Thor, confused and partially amnesiac, stops Hyde from hassling an innocent woman. This drives Hyde into an obsession with Thor's new friend, a museum employee named Jane Foster.

In other media

Television
 Mister Hyde appears in "The Mighty Thor" segment of The Marvel Super Heroes.
 Calvin Zabo appears in the second season of Agents of S.H.I.E.L.D. played by Kyle MacLachlan. This version, initially known as the "Doctor", uses a formula described as being primarily composed of "anabolic-androgenic steroids, a liver enzyme blocker, various metabolic enhancers, methamphetamines, gorilla testosterone, and a drop of peppermint", with a minimum of one milligram of adrenaline being required to achieve its full effect. Additionally, in addition to being the father of Daisy Johnson, with "Johnson" being his original surname before he went on the run, he is the husband of an Inhuman named Jiaying. Throughout his appearances, he joins forces with Jiaying to seek revenge on Daniel Whitehall for dissecting her and S.H.I.E.L.D. for denying him his revenge until he eventually realizes the error of his ways and saves Daisy from Jiaying by killing the latter for her. Following this, Phil Coulson alters his memory, which allows him to start over with a new identity and take up work as a veterinarian named "Winslow". As of the fourth season, Glenn Talbot successfully tasked scientists with recreating Zabo's formula and empowering Jeffrey Mace as part of "Project: Patriot".

Video games
 Mister Hyde appears as a boss in Iron Man and X-O Manowar in Heavy Metal.
 Mister Hyde appears as a boss and playable character in Marvel Avengers Alliance 2.
 Mister Hyde appears as a boss in Marvel Heroes. The Lizard breaks him out of prison to keep his human side dormant. In exchange, Zabo injects the Lizard with his Hyde formula to make him stronger and so they can combine their respective formulas and poison the Bronx Zoo's water supply to create reptilian-animal hybrids, only to be defeated by the players.
 Cal Johnson and Mister Hyde appear as playable characters in Lego Marvel's Avengers via the Agents of S.H.I.E.L.D. DLC.

Reception
Mister Hyde was ranked #15 on a listing of Marvel Comics' monster characters in 2015.

References

External links
 Mister Hyde at Marvel.com

Adaptations of works by Robert Louis Stevenson
Characters created by Don Heck
Characters created by Stan Lee
Comics characters introduced in 1963
Fictional biochemists
Fictional biologists
Fictional characters from New Jersey
Fictional characters with superhuman durability or invulnerability
Fictional mad scientists
Fictional medical specialists
Marvel Comics characters with accelerated healing
Marvel Comics characters with superhuman strength
Marvel Comics male supervillains
Marvel Comics mutates
Marvel Comics scientists
Marvel Comics supervillains
Marvel Comics television characters